Scott Highsmith is an American football coach.  He was most recently the head football coach at East Texas Baptist University for the 2017 season. Highsmith was the third head football coach at Belhaven College in Jackson, Mississippi and he held that position for three seasons, from 2003 until 2005.  His record at Belhaven was 13–20.  He resigned in 2005 to take an assistant coaching position at Southeastern Louisiana University under his previous mentor Dennis Roland.
   
Highsmith had spent 27 years in coaching as an assistant coach for various colleges and universities before taking the head coach position at Belhaven.  He earned a bachelor of science from Howard Payne University and a MS degree from East Texas State University.

Head coaching record

References

External links
 East Texas Baptist profile

Year of birth missing (living people)
Living people
Belhaven Blazers football coaches
East Texas Baptist Tigers football coaches
Kentucky Wildcats football coaches
Southeastern Louisiana Lions football coaches
Southeastern Oklahoma State Savage Storm football coaches
Howard Payne University alumni
Texas A&M University–Commerce alumni